Grünheide (Mark) is a municipality in the Oder-Spree District, in Brandenburg, Germany. It is situated 30 kilometres south-east of Berlin city centre, on the River Löcknitz. In 2020 Tesla, Inc. began to build Gigafactory Berlin-Brandenburg in Grünheide near the Autobahn A10.

Etymology 

The name "Grünheide" is a compound of grün (green) and Heide (heath). Mark means march (see March of Brandenburg). The Mark suffix is added to distinguish Grünheide (Mark) from Grünheide (Dettmannsdorf), Grünheide (Oberuckersee) and Grünheide (Auerbach/Vogtl.).

History 
The Grünheider area was a settlement area of Germanic tribes early on. Until the Reformation, all districts (except Hangelsberg) of today's community of Grünheide belonged to the Rüdersdorfer property of the Zinna Abbey.

The Thirty Years War completely depopulated the area. It was not until 1662 that Friedrich Wilhelm, the Great Elector, approved the settlement of a sawmill. Therefore, 1662 is considered to be the founding year of Grünheide, although Klein Wall appears in the Rüdersdorfer church book as early as 1642. Since 1933, a fieldstone monument below the church commemorates the founder of the place, Elector Joachim II. Between 1748 and 1763 King Friedrich II settled numerous small farmers and woodcutters in so-called colonies.

The making of the Löcknitz navigable in 1875 and the connection to the railway network via the nearby station Fangschleuse helped Grünheide to an upswing. Numerous wealthy Berlin citizens built large summer houses on the banks of Peetzsee and Werlsee. Among others Gerhart Hauptmann, Bertolt Brecht, Wilhelm Bölsche and Ernst Rowohlt spent the summer months in and near Grünheide.

Initially, Grünheide belonged to the III. Heath district of the Rüdersdorfer forest district. From 1889 the place was called Werlsee municipality, which was renamed Grünheide (Mark) on July 16, 1934.

In Grünheide the company vacation camp "Alexander Matrossow" was built by the VEB IFA-Automobilwerke Ludwigsfelde and after 1990 as' 'Children's and youth recreation Störitzland' continued. There was also a holiday camp in Altbuchhorst, which was operated by the GDR printing and publishing industry.

Geography

Grünheide lies in the northwest of the Oder-Spree District (German: Landkreis Oder-Spree, Lower Sorbian: Wokrejs Odra-Sprjewja; seat: Beeskow (Lower Sorbian: Bezkow)), directly bordering the Märkisch-Oderland District (seat: Seelow) to the north. Grünheide is clockwise surrounded by the municipalities of Rehfelde, Müncheberg, Steinhöfel, Fürstenwalde/Spree, Spreenhagen, Gosen-Neu Zittau, Erkner, Woltersdorf (bei Berlin), and Rüdersdorf bei Berlin.

Woltersdorf (bei Berlin), Erkner and Gosen-Neu Zittau directly border the southeasternmost localities of Berlin: Rahnsdorf, Müggelheim and Schmöckwitz, all of them belonging to the borough of Treptow-Köpenick (see boroughs and neighborhoods of Berlin).

Division of the town
Grünheide consists of the following districts:
 Grünheide (Mark) with the villages Grünheide, Alt Buchhorst, Bergluch, Gottesbrück and Fangschleuse
 Hangelsberg
 Kagel
 Kienbaum
 Mönchwinkel
 Spreeau

Demography

Personalities 

Curt Herrmann (1854-1929), Impressionist, lived in the mansion with a tower in the village part of the Hangelsberg from the year 1750. 
Fritz Rasp (1891-1976), actor, lived during his time in Berlin in his own house in what is today's Mönchwinkel.
Robert Havemann (1910-1982), chemist, communist, a resistance fighter against the National Socialism and Critical Critic in the GDR. Havemann lived in his house in today's district of Grünheide from 1976 to 1979 because of his criticism of the SED

See also
Baberowsee
Peetzsee

References

External links

 Official website 
 Tourism in Grünheide 

Localities in Oder-Spree